The Revolt, also published as Revolt, The Revolt: Inside Story of the Irgun and The Revolt: the Dramatic Inside Story of the Irgun, is a book about the militant Zionist organization Irgun Zvai Leumi, by one of its principal leaders, Menachem Begin. In Israel, the organization is commonly called Etzel, based on its Hebrew acronym.

History
The book traces the development of the Irgun from its early days in the 1930s, through its years of violent struggle in the Palestine Mandate against both British rule (the "revolt" of the title) and Arab opposition, to the outbreak of the 1948 Arab-Israeli War. The book is also part autobiographical, tracing Begin's own political development.

Originally published in Hebrew in 1951, an English translation by Samuel Katz was published that same year by W. H. Allen in the UK and Henry Schuman in the US. The book has gone through many editions and reprints, with the latest edition published in 2002.

The political scientist John Bowyer Bell, who studied both the Irgun and the Irish Republican Army (IRA), recalled that many of the IRA men whom he interviewed in the 1960s had read The Revolt and admired it as a manual of guerrilla warfare. It was also studied by African National Congress Nelson Mandela after he went underground in 1960, and credited it as being among the books he used a guide in planning the ANC's guerrilla campaign against the apartheid government of South Africa.

References

1951 non-fiction books
Irgun
History books about Zionism
Books about Israel
Books about Mandatory Palestine
Menachem Begin